Onyame, Nyankopon (Onyankapon) and Odomankoma are the trinity of the supreme god of the Akan people of Ghana, who is most commonly known as Anyame. The name means "The one who knows and sees everything", and "omniscient, omnipotent sky deity" in the Akan language.

Names

Odomankoma 
The name Odomankoma means "Creator" which is said to be derived from the literal translations of the two sections of his name, "Dom" (meaning state or universe) and "Anko-ma" (meaning "who alone gives"), meaning his name literally means "The only one who gives the universe or world". However, others believe Odomankoma is an abbreviation of Odomankoma's full and true name: O-doma-ara-nko-ma in which all parts of the name (excluding the first o) has a meaning: doma meaning 'abundance', ara meaning 'only, alone', ma meaning 'full of'; and hence coming together to mean 'The one who (of that which) is uninterruptedly, infinitely, and exclusively full of the manifold, namely, the interminable, eternally, infinitely, universally filled entity'. 

Odomankoma is known by the name Odomankoma wuo, which means "The Creator's death", referencing Odomankoma as the creator of Death, whose name is Owuo, and Death in return killed him. Odomankoma also goes by various other epithets: Oboade meaning Creator (an additional name of Creator), Oboo nkwa meaning the Creator of life and Oboo-wuo meaning the Creator of death, another name that is a call-back to Odomankoma creating Owuo (Death).

Odomankoma also has the name Borebore, meaning Architect, and Ananse Kokuroko, meaning the great designer or, literally, the great spider. This last name not only shows that Odomankoma possesses godly level of wisdom as in the Akom belief, it is believed that the wisdom of the spider is greater than that of all the world, but also shows his connection to Ananse, who is a spider and additionally might be directly Odomankoma's son. Odomankoma is also known as Amaomee meaning "The giver of plenty", linking to him being the creator in the Akom religion

Onyankapon 
The name Onyankapon literally means "The Only Great Onyame" which is said to be derived from the 3 parts that supposedly make up Onyankapon's name: "Onyame" shortened to "Onyan", "Koro" shortened to "Ka" meaning one and "Pon(g)" meaning great. His full name is Onyankapong

Onyankapon also goes by other epithets: Otumfoo meaning "the powerful one", Onyankapon Kwame meaning "the great one who appeared on Sunday" symbolising that was born on a Sunday and Twidiampon(g) meaning "all powerful Nyankapon(g)  and Amowia meaning "The giver of sun", referencing to Nyankapon's link to the sun. He also shares names with Odomankoma as Odomankoma became the spirit of Onyankapon after Owuo killed Odomankoma, so along with other names for Odomankoma, he has the names Opanyin or Nana, meaning "Grand Ancestor". Nyankapon might also be the Fante patron God Bobowissi, as well as the God stated as the supreme God in other traditional religions of peoples in Akan dominated countries such as Ivory Coat and Ghana specifically. However, they could either be their own Supreme God or Onyame, another aspect of the Akom Trinity and the parent to Onyankapon

Description 
Nyame, Nyankapon and Odomankoma are 3 aspects of the trinity that make up the Supreme God in the Akom religion. They are, however, one God.

Odomankoma: Odomankoma is the creative aspect of Nyame, corresponding to reason, reality and the Absolute, is the spirit of the Universe and is one of the most dynamic and complex modalities of Nyame, the Supreme Being. Odomankoma is consistently cast in the role of creator. This creative function of Odomankoma is embodied in several maxims. One saying of the Akan surrounding Odomankoma is "Odomankoma boo ade", meaning Odomankoma created the "Thing" (the universe). Odomankoma created not only the "Thing," i.e., the universe. He also created life and created death as well. In a mysterious manner Odomankoma himself succumbed to death. This juxtaposition of life (himself, the creator) with death in Odomankoma is expressed by the most enigmatic and unutterable of all Akan maxims: "Odomankoma boo owuo na owuo kum no", which means Odomankoma created death (Owuo) and death killed him. Odomankoma accommodates the contraries of life and death within his being. As the creator of both life and death, he transcends both experiences. The story of Odomankoma does not end with Owuo killing him as after his death, it is said that life (himself, as he is the creator) came to him and woke him up. From here he reived as Kra, and lives through Nyankapon, becoming Nyankapon's sunsum (soul), as stated in the Akan maxim "Onyankapon onye Odomankoma sunsum" which literally means Nyankapon is Odomankoma's personality, symbolising that Nyankapon is Odomankoma's successor (as Odomankoma used to be the aspect of the Nyame trinity that controlled everything until Owuo killed him). Odomankoma is also quite powerful and smart as after his "revival", Nyankapon/Odomankoma had a great struggle with Owuo in which they defeats Owuo with a resistance to Owuo's venom, kra (whom was now Odomankoma). Odomankoma then managed to achieve a total triumph over Death, as stated in the maxim "Odomankoma na orna owuo di akane", which means it was none but Odomankoma who made Death eat poison. In this second meeting between Odomankoma and his final creation, Owuo, Odomankoma unleashes his creative might upon Owuo as, after having been vanquished, death is made to eat his own poison. However, despite defeating Owuo, Owuo is still alive and causes death to mortals

It is said that he talks through a drum and has a drummer for that drum called Odomankoma Kyerema, the Drummer of Odomankoma who is said to be the most knowledgeable person regarding Asante traditional history. Odomankoma has a set of stories and tales called Adomankomasem, similar to Ananse

Odomankoma is also represented by two animals: vultures and spiders. Odomankoma's link to vultures is expressed in the Akan maxim: "Odomankoma a oboadee, ne kyeneboa ne opete", meaning the animal that symbolizes Odomankoma who created the world is the vulture. The spider connotation comes the belief by the Akan that spiders are the wisest of all animals, and it was possibly Ananse that advised Odomankoma to create humans. However, Odomankoma goes by the name Ananse Kokuroko, so it might have been just him. Odomankoma also has a human form, but storyteller rarely treat him as having a human form

Symbol
Nyame is the Twi word for god, and the Adinkra symbol "Gye Nyame" means "Nothing but God". 

The symbol has adopted a different use and meaning in today's Akan culture due to the influence of Christianity.

See also
Akan religion

References

Akan
African gods
Sky and weather gods
Legendary progenitors
Names of God in African traditional religions